The West Broadway Historic District in Columbia, Missouri is composed of 21 residential properties located facing Broadway on a plateau west of downtown. The district contains some of the largest and best preserved historic homes in Columbia.

The district was listed on the National Register of Historic Places in 2010 and includes the previously listed John N. and Elizabeth Taylor House.

References

Houses on the National Register of Historic Places in Missouri
Victorian architecture in Missouri
Buildings and structures in Columbia, Missouri
Houses in Boone County, Missouri
Historic districts on the National Register of Historic Places in Missouri
National Register of Historic Places in Boone County, Missouri